Ruth Sheen is an English actress. From the late 1980s, she has appeared in British television shows, films and plays. A participant in the films of Mike Leigh, she won the European Film Award for Best Actress for her performance as Shirley in Leigh's High Hopes (1988).

Early life 
Sheen was born in Stepney, London. She began her career training at the East 15 Acting School.

Career

Television 
Sheen had recurring roles as Nanny Simmons in Berkeley Square (1998) and as Nurse Ethel Carr in the series Bramwell (1995–1998). She also appeared as four different characters in six episodes of The Bill between 1989 and 2004. Also in 2004 she appeared in Agatha Christie’s Marple “The Murder at the Vicarage” as Mrs Tarrant.

She played Maureen Tacy in the series Doc Martin (2002) and appeared as Mrs Jones in the 2007 drama mini-series Fanny Hill, based on the erotic novel by John Cleland.

She appeared in Agatha Christie’s Poirot “Elephants Can Remember” (2013) as Madame Rosentelle and in Misfits (TV Series) as Maggie.

Sheen was the titular Elizabeth in "The Trial of Elizabeth Gadge", a 2015 episode of Inside No. 9. She has a supporting role as a pub landlord in the comedy series Brassic (2019–). Also in 2015. she appeared in the TV series Unforgotten as Lizzie Wilton and in 2016 in Midsomer Murders “Saints and Sinners” as Valerie Horton. In 2017, she acted in the TV mini-series Prime Suspect 1973 as Renee Bentley.

In 2021, Sheen featured in the last episode of the miniseries It's a Sin.

In 2022, Sheen appeared as secretary of private investigator C.B. Strike in season five of the series Strike.

Film 
Sheen frequently appears in the films of Mike Leigh. She played the female lead in High Hopes (1988), a laughing woman in Secrets & Lies (1996), Maureen in All or Nothing (2002), Lily in Vera Drake (2004), Gerri in Another Year (2010), and Sarah Danby in Mr. Turner (2014).

High Hopes was her breakthrough role. After Another Year she commented on Leigh's preference for improvisation: "It's a unique way of working... He's quite a hard taskmaster."

She played the mother of the character Jamie in Philip Ridley's 2009 feature film Heartless, and appeared in Welcome to the Punch (2013). She played Elsie in the 2016 film adaptation of A Street Cat Named Bob.

Theatre 
Sheen performed in Mike Leigh's play It's a Great Big Shame at the Theatre Royal Stratford East in 1993. She has appeared in Stoning Mary at the Royal Court Theatre, Market Boy at the Royal National Theatre and An Oak Tree at the Soho Theatre, all in London. In 2007, she played Lyn, opposite Ben Whishaw's Steven, in the world premiere of Philip Ridley's stage play Leaves of Glass at the Soho Theatre.

Awards 
In 1989, Sheen won the European Film Award for Best Actress for the role of Shirley in High Hopes. She was nominated for British actress of the year by the London Film Critics' Circle for Another Year.

References

External links

Living people
Actresses from London
Alumni of East 15 Acting School
European Film Award for Best Actress winners
English television actresses
English film actresses
20th-century English actresses
21st-century English actresses
English stage actresses
1950 births